3rd National Board of Review Awards
1931
The 3rd National Board of Review Awards were announced in 1931.

Top Ten Films 
Cimarron
City Lights
City Streets
Dishonored
The Front Page
The Guardsman
Quick Millions
Rango
Surrender
Tabu

Top Foreign Films 
The Threepenny Opera
The Song of Life
Under the Roofs of Paris
Westfront 1918

External links 
 National Board of Review of Motion Pictures :: Awards for 1931

1931
1931 film awards
1931 in American cinema